Sena I was King of Anuradhapura in the 9th century, whose reign lasted from 846 to 866. He succeeded his brother Aggabodhi IX as King of Anuradhapura and was succeeded by his nephew Sena II.

See also
 List of Sri Lankan monarchs
 History of Sri Lanka

References

External links
 Kings & Rulers of Sri Lanka
 Codrington's Short History of Ceylon

Monarchs of Anuradhapura
Sinhalese kings
House of Lambakanna II
9th-century Sinhalese monarchs